Yadkin College Historic District is a national historic district located at Yadkin College, Davidson County, North Carolina. The district encompasses 38 contributing buildings, 4 contributing sites, and 5 contributing structures in the village of Yadkin College.  The contributing buildings include the 1856 Yadkin College building, one antebellum house, 11 houses built between about 1870 and 1890, and the Yadkin College Methodist Protestant Church (1886). The sites are the Yadkin College Cemetery, the site of the 1881 Yadkin College building, site of the Methodist Episcopal Church, and site of the post office, blacksmith shop and jail. The structures are traditional wells and corn cribs.

It was added to the National Register of Historic Places in 1988.

References

Historic districts on the National Register of Historic Places in North Carolina
Gothic Revival architecture in North Carolina
Colonial Revival architecture in North Carolina
Buildings and structures in Davidson County, North Carolina
National Register of Historic Places in Davidson County, North Carolina